"Missing You" is a song by Chris de Burgh, released in 1988 as the first single from the album Flying Colours. The song reached the top 5 in the UK, peaking at No. 3. In Ireland, the song reached No. 1.

Track listing
UK 12" single
A. "Missing You" - 4:07
B1. "The Risen Lord" - 3:40
B2. "The Last Time I Cried" - 5:32

Chart performance

References

1988 songs
1988 singles
Chris de Burgh songs
Songs written by Chris de Burgh
Irish Singles Chart number-one singles
A&M Records singles